The Mandate of Heaven is a historical concept in Chinese history.

Mandate of Heaven can also refer to:

 The Mandate of Heaven: Record of a Civil War, China 1945–49  by John F. Melby
 Might and Magic VI: The Mandate of Heaven, a computer game